Magnum Rafael Farias Tavares  or simply  Magnum (born March 24, 1982 in Belém) is a Brazilian professional footballer, who plays as left-sided attacking midfielder.

Magnum previously played for Paysandu, Vitória Santos, Japanese side Kawasaki Frontale and Nagoya Grampus.

Club statistics

References

External links

 

1982 births
Living people
Brazilian footballers
Sportspeople from Belém
Brazilian expatriate footballers
Santos FC players
Paysandu Sport Club players
Tuna Luso Brasileira players
Esporte Clube Vitória players
Iraty Sport Club players
Kawasaki Frontale players
Nagoya Grampus players
Ulsan Hyundai FC players
Associação Desportiva São Caetano players
Clube do Remo players
Campeonato Brasileiro Série A players
J1 League players
K League 1 players
Brazilian expatriate sportspeople in South Korea
Expatriate footballers in Japan
Expatriate footballers in South Korea
Association football midfielders